USS Devastator may refer to the following ships of the United States Navy:

  was a ship that served during the World War II and Korean War eras.
  is an  commissioned by the US Navy on 6 October 1990.

United States Navy ship names